Abingdon was a constituency of the House of Commons of the Parliament of the United Kingdom (and its predecessor institutions for England and Great Britain), electing one Member of Parliament (MP) from 1558 until 1983. (It was one of the few English constituencies in the unreformed House of Commons to elect only one Member of Parliament (MP) by the first past the post system of election.)

History
Abingdon was one of three English parliamentary boroughs enfranchised by Queen Mary I as anomalous single-member constituencies, and held its first Parliamentary election in 1558. The borough consisted of part of two parishes in the market town of Abingdon, then the county town of Berkshire. The right to vote was exercised by all inhabitant householders paying scot and lot and not receiving alms; the highest recorded number of votes to be cast before 1832 was 253, at the general election of 1806.

Abingdon's voters seem always to have maintained their independence, and the constituency never came under the influence of a "patron" who assumed the right to choose the MP. Nevertheless, this did not always guarantee a pure election, and Porritt records that Abingdon offers the earliest case he was able to trace of a candidate trying to bribe voters with the promise of official office, later one of the most widespread abuses in English elections. In 1698, the defeated candidate, William Hucks, petitioned against the election of Sir Simon Harcourt, but during the hearing of the case it emerged that Hucks had promised that should he be elected an MP he would be made a Commissioner of the Excise, in which case he would use that power to appoint several of the voters to well-paid excise posts. The petition was dismissed and Hucks was committed to the custody of the sergeant-at-arms. (But ten years later, defeated again by Harcourt at the election of 1708, Hucks petitioned once more, on grounds of intimidation and other illegal practices, and this time Harcourt was ejected from his seat and Hucks declared to have been duly elected. Harcourt complained that the decision was a partisan one – which would have been by no means unusual at the period – "insisting to the last that he was the legal member, by a clear majority, by the most fair estimation".)

In 1831, the population of the borough was approximately 5,300, and contained 1,192 houses. This was sufficient for Abingdon to retain its MP under the Great Reform Act. (Indeed, it would have been big enough to retain two MPs had it had them, but there was no question of its representation being increased.) Its boundaries were unaltered, and under the reformed franchise 300 of the residents were qualified to vote.

In 1885 the borough constituency was abolished and the town was moved into a new county, The Northern or Abingdon Division of Berkshire. This constituency consisted of the northern part of the historic county, and as well as Abingdon included the towns of Wantage and Wallingford; it was predominantly agricultural at first, although its character changed during the 20th century with the growth of light industry round Abingdon, and it was generally a safe Conservative seat. This constituency survived essentially intact, with only minor boundary changes, until the 1983 general election, by which time it was simply called Abingdon County Constituency.

Changes in administrative boundaries during the 1970s moved most of the northern part of the historic county of Berkshire, including Abingdon, into the county of Oxfordshire. These changes were reflected in the constituency boundary changes introduced in 1983, and the Abingdon constituency was divided; most of its electors were placed in the new Wantage constituency and a significant minority including electors in the town of Abingdon were placed in the Oxford West and Abingdon constituency.  A small part to the south of the constituency had been retained within Berkshire and this area was transferred to Newbury.

Boundaries
1885–1918: The Northern, or Abingdon, Division of Berkshire was defined as consisting of the Abingdon, Faringdon, Wallingford, and Wantage petty sessional divisions of Berkshire, the municipal borough of Wallingford and the parts of the municipal boroughs of Abingdon and Oxford in Berkshire.

1918–1950: The rural districts of Abingdon (the civil parishes of Abingdon St Helen Without, Appleford, Appleton-with-Eaton, Besselsleigh, Cumnor, Draycot Moor, Drayton, Frilford, Fyfield, Garford, Kingston Bagpuize, Lyford, Marcham, Milton, North Hinksey, Radley, South Hinksey, Steventon, Sunningwell, Sutton Courtenay, Sutton Wick, Tubney, Wootton, and Wytham), Wallingford (the civil parishes of Aston Tirrold, Aston Upthorpe, Brightwell-cum-Sotwell, Cholsey, Didcot, East Hagbourne, Little Wittenham, Long Wittenham, Moulsford, North Moreton, South Moreton, and West Hagbourne), and Wantage (the civil parishes of Aldworth, Ardington, Beedon, Blewbury, Brightwalton, Catmore, Chaddleworth, Childrey, Chilton, Compton, Denchworth, East Challow, East Hanney, East Hendred, East Ilsley, Farnborough, Fawley, Goosey, Grove, Hampstead Norris, Harwell, Hermitage, Letcombe Bassett, Letcombe Regis, Lockinge, Peasemore, Sparshlt, Upton, West Challow, West Hanney and West Hendred, and West Ilsley), the part of the rural district of Bradfield which consisted of the civil parishes of Ashampstead, Basildon, Frilsham, Streatley, and Yattendon, the part of the rural district of Faringdon which was within the administrative county of Berks (the civil parishes of Ashbury, Baulking, Bourton, Buckland, Buscot, Charney Bassett, Coleshill, Compton Beauchamp, Eaton Hastings, Fernham, Great Coxwell, Great Faringdon, Hatford, Hinton Waldrist, Kingston Lisle, Little Coxwell, Littleworth, Longcot, Longworth, Pusey, Shellingford, Stanford in the Vale, Uffington, Watchfield, and Woolstone), the municipal boroughs of Abingdon and Wallingford, and the urban district of Wantage.

The constituency's boundaries were adjusted slightly by the Representation of the People Act 1918, gaining a small part of the Newbury Division. It was redefined in terms of the administrative county of Berkshire and the county districts created by the Local Government Acts of 1888 and 1894.

1950–1974: The boroughs of Abingdon and Wallingford, the urban district of Wantage, and the rural districts of Abingdon, Faringdon, Wallingford and Wantage.

The Representation of the People Act 1948 reorganised parliamentary constituencies, and Abingdon County Constituency was altered marginally, with the part of the rural district of Bradfield being transferred to the County Constituency of Newbury.

1974–1983: The boroughs of Abingdon and Wallingford, the urban district of Wantage, and the rural districts of Abingdon, Faringdon, Wallingford and Wantage.

The constituency was not altered by the Parliamentary Constituencies (England) Order of 1970, but was slightly amended prior to the February 1974 general election to take account of changes to local government boundaries.

Members of Parliament

1558–1640

1640–1885

MPs 1885–1983 
After the abolition of the parliamentary borough of Abingdon, a new county division of Berkshire was created.

Elections
Sources 1754–1784: Namier and Brooke; (parties) Stooks Smith. Positive swing is from Whig to Tory.
Sources 1885–1900: House of Commons 1901.

 Seat vacated on appointment of Morton as Chief Justice of Chester

 On petition Nathaniel Bayly seated in place of John Morton, 8 February 1770

 Tory hold from previous general election; Tory gain from Whig, from change on petition.
 Election declared void, 6 March 1775

 Change is calculated from the previous general election.
 Resignation of Mayor.

 Death of Howorth

Elections in the 1830s

Elections in the 1840s

Duffield resigned by accepting the office of Steward of the Chiltern Hundreds, causing a by-election.

Thesiger was appointed Attorney General for England and Wales, requiring a by-election.

Elections in the 1850s
Thesiger was appointed Attorney General for England and Wales, requiring a by-election.

Caulfeild's death caused a by-election.

Bertie succeeded to the peerage, becoming 6th Earl of Abingdon and causing a by-election.

Elections in the 1860s

Lindsay was appointed a Groom in Waiting to Queen Victoria, requiring a by-election.

Elections in the 1870s

Elections in the 1880s

Elections in the 1890s

Elections in the 1900s

Elections in the 1910s

Elections in the 1920s

Elections in the 1930s

Elections in the 1940s 
A General election was due to take place before the end of 1940, but was postponed due to the Second World War. By 1939, the following candidates had been selected to contest this constituency;
Conservative: Ralph Glyn  
Liberal: A D Macdonald MC 
Labour: Frank W Bourne

Elections in the 1950s

Elections in the 1960s

Elections in the 1970s

See also
List of UK Parliamentary constituencies 1955-1974 by region

Notes

References

Bibliography
 Boundaries of Parliamentary Constituencies 1885–1972, compiled and edited by F. W. S. Craig (Political Reference Publications 1972)
 British Parliamentary Election Results 1832–1885, compiled and edited by F.W.S. Craig (The Macmillan Press 1977)
 British Parliamentary Election Results 1885–1918, compiled and edited by F.W.S. Craig (The Macmillan Press 1974)
 British Parliamentary Election Results 1918–1949, compiled and edited by F.W.S. Craig (The Macmillan Press 1977)
 D. Brunton & D. H. Pennington, Members of the Long Parliament (London: George Allen & Unwin, 1954)
 Sir Lewis Namier and John Brooke, The House of Commons 1754–1790 (London: HMSO 1964)
 J. E. Neale, The Elizabethan House of Commons (London: Jonathan Cape, 1949)
 Robert H O'Byrne, The Representative History of Great Britain and Ireland, Part II – Berkshire (London: John Ollivier, 1848)
 T. H. B. Oldfield, The Representative History of Great Britain and Ireland (London: Baldwin, Cradock & Joy, 1816)
 Henry Pelling, Social Geography of British Elections 1885–1910 (London: Macmillan, 1967)
 J Holladay Philbin, Parliamentary Representation 1832 – England and Wales (New Haven: Yale University Press, 1965)
 Edward Porritt and Annie G Porritt, The Unreformed House of Commons (Cambridge University Press, 1903)
 Henry Stooks Smith, The Parliaments of England (1st edition published in three volumes 1844–50; 2nd edition edited in one volume by F.W.S. Craig, Political Reference Publications, 1973)
 Frederic A Youngs, jr, "Guide to the Local Administrative Units of England, Vol I" (London: Royal Historical Society, 1979)
 

Abingdon-on-Thames
Parliamentary constituencies in Berkshire (historic)
Parliamentary constituencies in Oxfordshire (historic)
Constituencies of the Parliament of the United Kingdom established in 1558
Constituencies of the Parliament of the United Kingdom disestablished in 1983
1558 establishments in England
1983 disestablishments in England